Knud Jørgen Olsen (2 October 1906 – 13 June 1994) was a Danish rower. He competed at the 1928 Summer Olympics in Amsterdam with the men's eight where they were eliminated in round two.

References

1906 births
1994 deaths
Danish male rowers
Olympic rowers of Denmark
Rowers at the 1928 Summer Olympics
Rowers at the 1936 Summer Olympics
Rowers from Copenhagen
European Rowing Championships medalists